Princenhage is a neighbourhood in the southwest of the city Breda in the Dutch province of North Brabant.

Until 1942, Princenhage was a separate municipality. The original name of the municipality was "Haage", which was changed to "Princenhage" in 1819.

References

Populated places in North Brabant
Former municipalities of North Brabant
Breda